SRC Montréal may refer to:

CBF-FM, Ici Radio-Canada Première on 95.1 FM
CBFX-FM, Ici Musique on 100.7 FM
CBFT-DT, Ici Radio-Canada Télé on channel 2

See also
CBC Montreal (disambiguation)
Maison Radio-Canada, the main CBC/Radio-Canada premises in Montreal